National Route 171 is a national highway of Japan connecting Minami-ku, Kyoto and Chūō-ku, Kobe in Japan, with a total length of 67.7 km (42.07 mi). Almost exactly in the middle of the highway's length lies an ancient ryokan built in 1635 called the Tsubaki Shogunate's Inn. Records show that Asano Naganori of Forty-seven rōnin fame stayed every year between 1697 and 1701's Ako incident. The inn burnt down in 1718 but was rebuilt and still exists today, remaining unchanged for almost 300 years.

References

National highways in Japan
Roads in Hyōgo Prefecture
Roads in Kyoto Prefecture
Roads in Osaka Prefecture